Noack's roundleaf bat (Hipposideros ruber) is a species of bat in the family Hipposideridae. It is found throughout tropical Africa. Its natural habitats are subtropical or tropical moist lowland forests, moist savanna, and caves and other subterranean habitats.

Taxonomy 
The bat is also known by the synonyms H. centralis and H. niapu.

Description 
Newly molted individuals of the species are gray in color, but eventually turn orange, lost probably due to the presence of ammonia in roosts.

Biology 
Some populations of the bat are partially diurnal, with daytime foraging, chases, and other activity observed in populations of H. ruber on the island of São Tomé.

Diet 
The bat seems to hunt by detecting the fluttering of wings by moths to decide whether to attack. If a moth was not fluttering its wings, or stopped during an attack, the bat would terminate its approach. The bat also does not use sight or sound to detect fluttering of wings. This appears to be a way to reduce clutter while hunting.

Echolocation 
The bat echolocates at a frequency of 132-138 kHz.

Habitat and distribution 
The bat's range extends throughout much of West, Central, and East Africa and part of southern Africa including Angola, southern Democratic Republic of the Congo, northern and eastern Zambia, southern Malawi and north-western Mozambique. The bat can be found up until 2300 meters above sea level.

The bat mainly inhabits lowland tropical moist forest but is also found in relic and riverine forests in dry savanna. The bat is known to roost in caves, rocky crevices and abandoned mineshafts. Animals have also been found under a bridge, in a hollow kapok tree and in derelict buildings.

Conservation 
The species is assessed as least-concern due to its large population, widespread range, and lack of considerable decline in population. The bat may be locally threatened in some areas due to habitat loss and subsistence hunting. The bat is not protected by any laws, but is known to exist in the Manga Forest Reserve of Tanzania.

References

Hipposideros
Mammals described in 1893
Bats of Africa
Taxonomy articles created by Polbot